The UTeach Institute is a nonprofit organization created in 2006 in response to growing concerns about science, technology, engineering, and mathematics (STEM) education in the United States and interest in the secondary STEM teacher certification program, UTeach, started in 1997 at The University of Texas at Austin.

The UTeach Institute issued its first request for proposals to replicate UTeach in 2007. An initial cohort of 13 universities was selected to receive individual grants of up to $1.4 million each to replicate the program over a four-year implementation period from 2008 to 2012. A second cohort of 8 universities was selected for a 2010-2014 grant cycle, and a third cohort of universities is expected to begin implementation in Spring 2012.

The UTeach Institute acts as the liaison between the original UTeach program at The University of Texas at Austin and individuals implementing the program on other university campuses. The Institute provides detailed technical assistance and support and hosts an annual conference  in Austin, Texas focusing on issues of STEM teacher preparation, national and state STEM education policy, the UTeach program model, and UTeach replication. In addition to assisting the universities implementing UTeach, the UTeach Institute conducts ongoing evaluations of progress and fulfills reporting requirements to various funders.

UTeach has been a model for mathematics and science education programs at other institutions, and has been expanded to involve an additional forty-four universities in twenty-one states by 2019.

 2008-2012 (cohort 1)
 Florida State University
 Louisiana State University
 Northern Arizona University
 Temple University
 University of California, Berkeley
 University of California, Irvine
 University of Colorado Boulder
 University of Florida
 University of Houston
 University of Kansas
 University of North Texas
 University of Texas, Dallas
 Western Kentucky University
 2010-2014 (cohort 2)
 Cleveland State University
 Middle Tennessee State University
 University of Colorado Colorado Springs
 University of Memphis
 University of Tennessee, Chattanooga
 University of Tennessee, Knoxville
 University of Texas, Arlington
 University of Texas at Tyler
 2011-2015 (cohort 3)
 Columbus State University
 Southern Polytechnic State University
 University of Massachusetts, Lowell
 University of West Georgia
 2012-2016 (cohort 4)
 Boise State University
 Florida Institute of Technology
 Towson University
 University of Arkansas at Fayetteville
 University of Arkansas at Little Rock
 University of Central Arkansas
 University of Texas at Brownsville
 University of Texas, Pan American
 2013-2018 (cohort 5)
 Drexel University
 Florida International University
 University of Maryland, College Park
 Oklahoma State University
 Old Dominion University
 University of Alabama, Birmingham
 2015-2019 (cohort 6)
 George Washington University
 Louisiana Tech University
 University of Massachusetts, Boston
 University of Nevada, Reno  
 West Virginia University
2016–2020 (cohort 7)
University of Texas at San Antonio
Morehead State University

2017–2021 (cohort 8)
Central Washington University

The UTeach Institute partners with corporations, foundations, states, and private donors to fund  UTeach replication.

References

External links 
 The UTeach Institute
 UTeach

Educational organizations based in the United States